Satpal Saini was an Indian politician and member of the Bharatiya Janata Party. Saini was a member of the Punjab Legislative Assembly from the Sujanpur constituency in Pathankot district.

References 

People from Jaipur district
2020 deaths